Tránsito Montepeque (born 16 December 1980) is a Guatemalan footballer and currently a free agent.

Club career
Montepeque made his top division debut for Coban Imperial when he was 23 years old, but he immediately scored a winning extra-time goal which won the club a historic first (and only) league title. He then moved to Comunicaciones where his playing time has, so far, been limited due to the presence of the Costa Rican striker Rolando Fonseca and the Guatemalan national team player Dwight Pezzarossi. With the departure of both Fonseca and Pezzarossi, Montepeque has been a prominent striker for the club.

On 1 October 2011 Montepeque scored the fastest goal since the Apertura and Clausura tournament format was introduced in 1999. He netted the first goal of a 3-1 win for Comunicaciones against Heredia 9 seconds into the match.

Personal life
Tránsito has a younger cousin named Jean Carlos Montepeque who also plays for Comunicaciones as a defender.

International career
Montepeque made his debut for Guatemala in a July 2004 friendly match against El Salvador and has, as of January 2010, earned a total of 19 caps, scoring 5 goals. He has so far only represented his country in friendly matches.

International goals
Scores and results list. Guatemala's goal tally first.

External links

References

1980 births
Living people
People from Escuintla Department
Association football forwards
Guatemalan footballers
Guatemala international footballers
Xelajú MC players
Comunicaciones F.C. players
2011 Copa Centroamericana players